Kosmos 47 ( meaning Cosmos 47) is the designation of an uncrewed test flight of a prototype Soviet Voskhod spacecraft, the first multiple-occupant spacecraft. Launched on 6 October 1964, the successful flight paved the way for the first crewed mission, Voskhod 1, which occurred just 6 days later on 12 October 1964.

The spacecraft was one of many designated under the Kosmos system, which is applied to a wide variety of spacecraft of different designs and functions including test flights of crewed vehicles.

Launch
The launch took place on 6 October at 07:12 GMT from Gagarin's Start, Site 1/5 at Baikonur Cosmodrome on board a Voskhod rocket s/n R15000-02. On 7 October 1964, testing of all the spacecraft's systems occurred in the space of 24 hours. The landing took place on 7 October 1964 at around 07:30 GMT. The spacecraft was deorbited with its return capsule descending by parachute for recovery by Soviet Forces.

Spacecraft
The Voskhods spacecraft were adaptations of the single place Vostok spacecraft meant to conduct flights with up to three crew and for spacewalks in advance of the American Gemini program. Work on the 3KV and 3KD versions of the basic Vostok spacecraft began with the decree issued on 13 April 1964. In order to accommodate more than one crew, the seats were mounted perpendicular to the Vostok ejection seat position, so the crew had to crane their necks to read instruments, still mounted in their original orientation. The "Elburs" soft landing system replaced the ejection seat and allowed the crew to stay in the capsule. It consisted of probes that dangled from the parachute lines. Contact with the Earth triggered a solid rocket engine in the parachute which resulted in a zero velocity landing.

See also

 1964 in spaceflight

References

External links
 Voskhod - A Summary

Spacecraft launched in 1964
Kosmos satellites
1964 in the Soviet Union
Spacecraft which reentered in 1964